Actinochaetopteryx setifacies is a species of parasitic fly in the family Tachinidae.

Distribution
Sulawesi.

References

Diptera of Asia
Dexiinae
Insects described in 1988
Fauna of Sulawesi